Come Alive may refer to:

Music
 Come Alive (Daniel Ash album), 2005
 Come Alive (Paulini album), 2015
 Come Alive (Mark Schultz album), 2009

Songs
 "Come Alive" (Paris Hilton song), 2014
 "Come Alive (The War of the Roses)", a 2009 song by Janelle Monáe
 "Come Alive" (Netsky song), 2012
 "Come Alive", a song by Biohazard from Reborn in Defiance, 2012
 "Come Alive", a song by Gotthard from Domino Effect, 2007
 "Come Alive", a song by Hurricane No. 1 from Only the Strongest Will Survive, 1999
 "Come Alive", a song by Jeremy Camp from Reckless, 2013
 "Come Alive", a song by Leona Lewis from Glassheart, 2012
 "Come Alive," a song by Hugh Jackman from The Greatest Showman, 2017
 "Come Alive", a song by Madonna from Madame X, 2019
 "Come Alive", a song by Pendulum, 2021